The 50th Street station was a local station on the demolished IRT Ninth Avenue Line in Manhattan, New York City. It was built on January 18, 1876 and eventually had two levels. The lower level was built first and had two tracks and two side platforms that served local trains. The upper level was built as part of the Dual Contracts and had one track that served express trains. It closed on June 11, 1940. The next southbound stop was 42nd Street. The next northbound stop was 59th Street.

References

IRT Ninth Avenue Line stations
Railway stations in the United States opened in 1876
Railway stations closed in 1940
Former elevated and subway stations in Manhattan